The Tournament of State Champions (TOSC) is an annual Little League Baseball tournament featuring 8-10-year-old and 9-11-year-old state champions.  The 8-10 tournament was first held in August 2005 at Mitch Stadium, located upon the town borders of Ceredo, West Virginia and Kenova, West Virginia. The 9-11 tournament was first held in August 2010 at Elm Street Park, located in Greenville, NC. The fifteenth annual 8-10 Tournament of State Champions is scheduled to be held in Greenville, North Carolina in 2019. The tenth annual 9-11 Tournament of State Champions is scheduled to be held in Greenville, North Carolina in 2019.

In 2009, the Tournament of State Champions was played in Huntington, West Virginia while Mitch Stadium was the location of the 2009 Little League Baseball and Softball Southeast Regional Tournaments.  The 2019 Tournament of State Champions will be hosted at Stallings Stadium at Elm Street Park in Greenville, NC.

The participating states in the tournament are Alabama, Florida, Georgia, North Carolina, South Carolina, Tennessee, Virginia, and West Virginia (Indiana and Kentucky participated in the first four tournaments). Over 1,000 registered 8-10 year-old and 9-11 year old teams begin play each June in these eight states.

TOSC Championship Games

8-10 All Time Participating Teams 
 Alabama

 Florida

Georgia

North Carolina

South Carolina

Tennessee

Virginia

West Virginia

9-11 All Time Participating Teams 
Alabama

Florida

Georgia

North Carolina

South Carolina

Tennessee

Virginia

West Virginia

External links
 Tournament of State Champions
 toscgreenvillenc.com

Little League
Youth baseball in the United States
Baseball competitions in the United States
Baseball competitions in Alabama
Baseball competitions in Florida
Baseball competitions in Georgia (U.S. state)
Baseball competitions in North Carolina
Baseball competitions in South Carolina
Baseball competitions in Tennessee
Baseball competitions in Virginia
Baseball competitions in West Virginia